Woodhey or Woodheys may refer to:

Woodhey, an area of Bebington, Merseyside,
Woodhey or Woodhey Green, a small settlement in the Faddiley civil parish of Cheshire,
Woodhey Chapel, Faddiley, a private chapel in Cheshire,
Woodhey Cross, an ancient stone cross in Cheshire,
Woodhey High School, a secondary school in Ramsbottom, in the Metropolitan Borough of Bury, Greater Manchester.
Woodheys Primary School, a primary school in Sale, Trafford, Greater Manchester
Woodheys Park, a park next to the Woodheys Estate in Sale Greater Manchester